Subramaniya Gopalakrishnan (full name Nenmara Subramaniya Gopalakrishnan; born 14 September 1940) was an Indian cricketer. He was a right-handed batsman and wicket-keeper who played for Kerala. He was born in Jamshedpur.

Gopalakrishnan made a single first-class appearance for the side, during the 1963-64 season, against Hyderabad. He scored 9 runs in the first innings in which he batted, and 6 runs in the second, though this was not enough to save Kerala from an innings defeat.

External links
Subramaniya Gopalakrishnan at Cricket Archive

1940 births
Living people
Indian cricketers
Kerala cricketers